Maluda may refer to:

 Maluda (artist) (1934—1999), Portuguese painter
 Maluda (musician) (born 1988), Kenyan musician